Jeffrey Brace (born Boyrereau Brinch;  – April 20, 1827) was a former slave who was taken from West Africa around 1750 and a veteran of the American Revolutionary War. He became the first African-American citizen of Poultney, Vermont. Brace became blind in his later years and published his memoirs under the title The Blind African Slave or the Memoirs of Boyrereau Brinch Nicknamed Jeffrey Brace. The faculty union at the University of Vermont now offers a $500 book award in his name "to students who exemplify academic excellence and an active commitment to achieving social and economic justice."

Early life
Jeffrey Brace was born in West Africa circa 1742 as Boyrereau Brinch.  A free African, he was later captured and sold into slavery.

Military service
As an enslaved sailor, he served in the privateer ship of Captain Isaac Mills, his enslaver, during the French and Indian War. Brace later fought as an enslaved soldier in the American Revolutionary War.

Post-war years
Following the war, Jeffrey Brace received his freedom from his former owner in Connecticut.

Death
Jeffrey Brace died on January 31, 1827, in Georgia, Vermont.

References 

Brace, Jeffrey.  The Blind African Slave or the Memoirs of Boyrereau Brinch Nicknamed Jeffrey Brace.
Nell, William Cooper.  The Colored Patriots of the American Revolution, With Sketches of Several Distinguished Colored Persons: To Which Is Added a Brief Survey of the Condition And Prospects of Colored Americans.

18th-century American slaves
People from Poultney (town), Vermont
Writers from Vermont
1827 deaths
Black Patriots
American blind people
Royal Navy sailors
People of pre-statehood U.S. states
Royal Navy personnel of the Seven Years' War
British military personnel of the French and Indian War